Stephen Powers may refer to:
Stephen Powers (1840–1904), American journalist, ethnographer, and historian
Stephen Roger Powers (born 1974), American poet, and comic
Stephen Powers (artist) (born 1968), American artist
Steve Powers (born 1934), American musician, journalist and teacher
Steve Powers (baseball), University of Arizona baseball player